A steam tricycle is a steam-driven three-wheeled vehicle.

History
In the early days of motorised vehicle development, a number of experimenters built steam-powered vehicles with three wheels. The first steam tricycle – and probably the first true self-propelled land vehicle – was Nicolas-Joseph Cugnot's 1769 Fardier à vapeur (steam dray), a three-wheeled machine with a top speed of around 3 km/h (2 mph) originally designed for hauling artillery. Failing to meet the army's design criteria, no further development was undertaken.

The Long steam tricycle appears to be one of the earliest preserved examples, built by George A. Long around 1880 and patented some time around 1882; an example is on display at the Smithsonian Institution.

In 1881 the Parkyns-Bateman steam tricycle was demonstrated in England. It used a petroleum-fired steam boiler (making it the first petroleum-powered vehicle), driving a double-acting two cylinder steam engine on the chassis of a Cheylesmore tricycle. Although numerous orders were reportedly placed, British law made such vehicles essentially illegal on the public roads. An example was displayed in the Science Museum from 1912 to 1922.

A small steam tricycle was built by Albert, Comte de Dion in 1887. This had two wheels in the front, between which was mounted the boiler, and a single rear wheel driven by the engine. It was fitted with pneumatic tyres.

In the same year Léon Serpollet also constructed a coal-fired steam tricycle, with the "steam generator" (boiler) mounted between two rear wheels. These and other experimenters also built four-wheeled steam-powered vehicles. The invention of the internal combustion engine led to the replacement of steam in most cases, although steam cars continue to be built to the present day in small numbers.

Bibliography
 Singer, Charles Joseph; Raper, Richard. A history of technology : edited by Charles Singer ... [et al.]. Clarendon Press, 1954-1978. History e-book project.. ACLS Humanities E-book. Vol 5. Chapter 18. pp. 423–424.

See also

 History of steam road vehicles
 Steamroller
 Steam tractor
 Timeline of transportation technology
 Traction engine
 List of motorized trikes

References

Tricycle
 
Three-wheeled motor vehicles